The Black Mountain poets, sometimes called projectivist poets, were a group of mid-20th-century American avant-garde or postmodern poets centered on Black Mountain College in North Carolina.

Background

Although it lasted only twenty-three years (1933–1956) and enrolled fewer than 1,200 students, Black Mountain College was one of the most fabled experimental institutions in art education and practice. It launched a remarkable number of the artists who spearheaded the avant-garde in the America of the 1960s. It boasted an extraordinary curriculum in the visual, literary, and performing arts as evidenced by some of the artists and teachers listed below.

Among the literature teachers and students were Robert Creeley, Fielding Dawson, Ed Dorn, Robert Duncan, Paul Goodman, Francine du Plessix Gray, Hilda Morley, Charles Olson, M. C. Richards, Arthur Penn, and John Wieners.

Projective verse
In 1950, Charles Olson published his seminal essay, Projective Verse. In this, he called for a poetry of "open field" composition to replace traditional closed poetic forms with an improvised form that should reflect exactly the content of the poem. This form was to be based on the line, and each line was to be a unit of breath and of utterance. The content was to consist of "one perception immediately and directly (leading) to a further perception". This essay was to become a kind of de facto manifesto for the Black Mountain poets. One of the effects of narrowing the unit of structure in the poem down to what could fit within an utterance was that the Black Mountain poets developed a distinctive style of poetic diction (e.g. "yr" for "your").

Principal figures
In addition to Olson, the poets most closely associated with Black Mountain include Larry Eigner, Robert Duncan, Ed Dorn, Paul Blackburn, Hilda Morley, John Wieners, Joel Oppenheimer, Denise Levertov, Jonathan Williams and Robert Creeley. Creeley worked as a teacher and editor of the  Black Mountain Review for two years, moving to San Francisco in 1957. There, he acted as a link between the Black Mountain poets and the Beats, many of whom he had published in the review. Also, the appearance in 1960 of Donald Allen's anthology The New American Poetry 1945–1960 (which divides the poets included in its pages into various schools) was crucial: it established a legacy and promoted the influence of the Black Mountain poets worldwide.

Legacy
Apart from their strong interconnections with the Beats, the Black Mountain poets influenced the course of later American poetry via their importance for the poets later identified with the Language School. They were also important for the development of innovative British poetry since the 1960s, as evidenced by such poets as Tom Raworth and J. H. Prynne. In Canada, the Vancouver-based TISH group, including George Bowering and Daphne Marlatt, were heavily influenced by the Black Mountain poets. Modern projectivist poets include Charles Potts.

References

Further reading
Dawson, Fielding The Black Mountain Book. Croton Press, Ltd., NY 1970 Library of Congress Catalog Number: 70-135203
Edith C. Blum Art Institute. 1987. The Black Mountain poets: the emergence of an American school of poetics, June 26–28, 1987. Annandale-on-Hudson, NY: Edith C. Blum Art Institute, Bard College. 
Harris, Mary Emma. The Arts at Black Mountain College. MIT Press, 2002. 
Katz, Vincent (editor). Black Mountain College: Experiment in Art. MIT Press, 2003. 
Dewey, Anne. "Beyond Maximums: The Construction of Public Voice in Black Mountain Poetry." Stanford U Press, 2007.

External links
blackmountaincollege.org 
1984 audio interview with Robert Creeley by Don Swaim of CBS Radio
Projective Verse essay by Charles Olson 

 
American literary movements
Modernist poetry in English
North Carolina culture
Buncombe County, North Carolina
20th-century American literature